David Deng Kongor Deng (born 25 June 2000), also known as Dikong, is a South Sudanese basketball player, who plays for Cobra Sport of the Basketball Africa League (BAL).

Early life
Deng was born in the Ugandan city of Arua, to South Sudanese parents. He studied at Arua Public Primary School and St. Joseph College, Ombaci. He later played for the junior teams Giant Stomers and Destiny Phenoms.

Club career
In 2019, Deng joined the UCU Canons of the NBL Uganda. He guided his team to the NBL Finals, where the team lost to City Oilers. He transferred to the Nam Blazers in the offseason. The following season, he was third in scoring in the 2021 season with 16.6 points per game.

In 2021, he joined South Sudanese team Cobra Sport to play in the 2022 BAL qualification. Over five games, he averaged 15.6 points and 6.6 rebounds, helping his team qualify for its first-ever BAL appearance.

National team career
On October 10, 2021, Deng was selected to play for the Uganda national basketball team in the qualifiers for FIBA AfroBasket 2021. He pulled out on October 22, citing his ambitions to represent South Sudan in international competitions.

BAL career statistics

|-
|style="text-align:left;"|2022
|style="text-align:left;"|Cobra Sport
| 4 || 2 || 17.9 || .333 || .316 || .778 || 2.5 || .8 || 1.3 || .0 || 7.8
|- class="sortbottom"
| style="text-align:center;" colspan="2"|Career
| 4 || 2 || 17.9 || .333 || .316 || .778 || 2.5 || .8 || 1.3 || .0 || 7.8

References

Living people
2000 births
UCU Canons players
Nam Blazers players
Cobra Sport players
Power forwards (basketball)
South Sudanese men's basketball players
People from Arua District